Polly Bergen (born Nellie Paulina Burgin; July 14, 1930 – September 20, 2014) was an American actress, singer, television host, writer and entrepreneur.

She won an Emmy Award in 1958 for her performance as Helen Morgan in Helen Morgan (Playhouse 90). For her stage work, she was nominated for the Tony Award for Best Featured Actress in a Musical for her performance as Carlotta Campion in Follies in 2001. Her film work included Cape Fear (1962) and The Caretakers (1963), for which she was nominated for the Golden Globe Award for Best Actress in a Motion Picture – Drama. She hosted her own weekly variety show for one season (The Polly Bergen Show), was a regular panelist on the TV game show To Tell the Truth, and later in life had roles in The Sopranos and Desperate Housewives. She wrote three books on beauty, fashion, and charm. She is also the inspiration behind Mother Goose in The Land of Stories.

Early life
Bergen was born in Knoxville, Tennessee to Lucy (née Lawhorne; 1909–1985) and William Hugh Burgin (1909–1982), a construction engineer. Bill Bergen, as he was later known, had singing talent and appeared with his daughter in several episodes of her 18-episode comedy/variety show The Polly Bergen Show, which aired during the 1957–1958 television season to much fanfare. They released a duet Columbia LP, Polly and Her Pop.

Career

Bergen appeared in many film roles, most notably in the original Cape Fear (1962) opposite Gregory Peck and Robert Mitchum. She had roles as the romantic interest in three Dean Martin and Jerry Lewis comedy films in the early 1950s: At War with the Army, That's My Boy, and The Stooge. She was featured in a number of Westerns during the 1950s, including Warpath, Arena, and Escape from Fort Bravo. She starred in the horse racing comedy Fast Company; she starred as the first female commander-in-chief in Kisses for My President; and as the wife of James Garner in the romantic comedy Move Over, Darling, which also starred Doris Day. Bergen's later roles included Mrs. Vernon-Williams in Cry-Baby, a John Waters film.

Bergen received an Emmy Award for her portrayal of singer Helen Morgan in the episode The Helen Morgan Story of the 1950s television series Playhouse 90. Signed to Columbia Records, she also enjoyed a successful recording career during this era. She recorded an album in 1957 titled, Bergen Sings Morgan, which included the song "Bill".

In the 1950s, she became known as "The Pepsi Cola Girl", having done a series of commercials for this product.

She was a regular panelist on the game show To Tell the Truth during its original run. She was an occasional panelist and appeared three times as the mystery guest on What's My Line?. She appeared on the interview program Here's Hollywood. She earned two Emmy Award nominations for her role as Rhoda Henry, wife of Captain "Pug" Henry (played by Robert Mitchum), in two miniseries: The Winds of War and its sequel War and Remembrance.

Bergen starred in a 2001 Broadway revival of Stephen Sondheim's Follies at the Belasco Theater and received a Tony Award nomination as Best Featured Actress in a Musical. In 2003, she starred at the same theatre in Six Dance Lessons in Six Weeks opposite Mark Hamill in a role she took over from Rue McClanahan.

In 2004, Bergen played Fran Felstein on HBO's The Sopranos, the former mistress of Johnny Soprano and John F. Kennedy. From 2007 to 2011, Bergen had a guest role in Desperate Housewives as Stella Wingfield, which earned her an Emmy Award nomination.

She was a semi-regular cast member of Commander-in-Chief (2006) as the mother of Mackenzie Allen, the fictional president of the United States, played by Geena Davis. Bergen had once played the first female president of the United States in the movie Kisses for My President (1964). Another late appearance came in the Hallmark Hall of Fame presentation Candles on Bay Street (2006), in which she played the assistant to a husband-and-wife team of veterinarians.

In 1965, Bergen created the Polly Bergen Company cosmetics line also known as Oil of the Turtle. She also created lines of jewelry and shoe brands, and wrote three books on beauty.

Personal life
Bergen was married to actor Jerome Courtland from 1950 to 1955. In 1957, she married Hollywood agent-producer Freddie Fields, with whom she had two adopted children, Pamela Kerry Fields and Peter William Fields, and stepdaughter, Kathy Fields. Bergen converted from Southern Baptist to Judaism upon marrying Fields. The couple divorced in 1975. She was married to entrepreneur Jeffrey Endervelt in the 1980s.

In 1991, Bergen spoke about having had an abortion, for inclusion in the book The Choices We Made: Twenty-Five Women and Men Speak Out About Abortion.

On March 31, 1993, Brandon Lee died accidentally on the set of The Crow, and in early April, Bergen held a memorial at her home in Los Angeles with 200 of Lee's family, friends, and business associates attended.

Bergen was a liberal-minded, politically active Democrat and feminist. She was an active advocate of the Equal Rights Amendment, women's education, and Planned Parenthood. Bergen's niece is the television producer Wendy Riche.

Death
Bergen died of natural causes on September 20, 2014 at her home in Southbury, Connecticut, surrounded by family and close friends. She had been diagnosed with emphysema and other ailments in the late 1990s. Upon her death, she was cremated.

Filmography

Film

Television

Radio appearances

Discography 
Albums list adapted from AllMusic and Discogs.

Albums 
 1955: Little Girl Blue (10" LP)
 1956: The Girls
 1956: Today's Hits (EP)
 1957: Bergen Sings Morgan (Billboard 200 – No. 10)
 1957: The Party's Over (Billboard 200 – No. 20)
 1958: Polly and Her Pop (accompanied on guitar & vocals by her father, Bill Bergen)
 1959: My Heart Sings – Columbia #CS 8018 – orchestra conducted by Luther Henderson (re-released in 1996)
 1959: All Alone by the Telephone
 1959: First Impressions – with Farley Granger and Hermione Gingold
 1960: Four Seasons of Love
 1961: Sings the Hit Songs from Do-Re-Mi and Annie Get Your Gun
 1963: Act One, Sing Too

Singles
 1958: "Come Prima" (Billboard Hot 100 – No. 67)

Bibliography

References

External links

 
 
 
 
 Polly Bergen – Madame President 
 Gallery: Polly Bergen in Knoxville, TN

1930 births
2014 deaths
Actresses from Indiana
Actresses from Tennessee
American film actresses
American musical theatre actresses
American television actresses
American stage actresses
American entertainment industry businesspeople
American memoirists
American women memoirists
American women in business
Columbia Records artists
Compton High School alumni
Connecticut Democrats
Converts to Judaism from Baptist denominations
Former Baptists
Indiana Democrats
Jewish American actresses
Jewish women singers
Jubilee Records artists
RCA Victor artists
Torch singers
Traditional pop music singers
Musicians from Richmond, Indiana
Nightclub performers
Outstanding Performance by a Lead Actress in a Miniseries or Movie Primetime Emmy Award winners
People from Knoxville, Tennessee
Tennessee Democrats
Writers from Richmond, Indiana
21st-century American Jews
21st-century American women